The 2020 Bass Pro Shops NRA Night Race presented by Wendy's was a NASCAR Cup Series race held on September 19, 2020 at Bristol Motor Speedway in Bristol, Tennessee. Contested over 500 laps on the  short track, it was be the 29th race of the 2020 NASCAR Cup Series season, third race of the Playoffs and final race of the Round of 16.

Report

Background

The Bristol Motor Speedway, formerly known as Bristol International Raceway and Bristol Raceway, is a NASCAR short track venue located in Bristol, Tennessee. Constructed in 1960, it held its first NASCAR race on July 30, 1961. Despite its short length, Bristol is among the most popular tracks on the NASCAR schedule because of its distinct features, which include extraordinarily steep banking, an all concrete surface, two pit roads, and stadium-like seating. It has also been named one of the loudest NASCAR tracks.

Entry list
 (R) denotes rookie driver.
 (i) denotes driver who are ineligible for series driver points.

Qualifying
Brad Keselowski was awarded the pole for the race as determined by competition-based formula.

Starting Lineup

Race

Stage Results

Stage One
Laps: 125

Stage Two
Laps: 125

Final Stage Results

Stage Three
Laps: 250

Race statistics
 Lead changes: 14 among 8 different drivers
 Cautions/Laps: 5 for 50
 Red flags: 0
 Time of race: 2 hours, 46 minutes and 43 seconds
 Average speed:

Media

Television
NBC Sports covered the race on the television side. Rick Allen, 2008 Food City 500 winner Jeff Burton, Steve Letarte and Dale Earnhardt Jr. covered the race from the booth at Charlotte Motor Speedway. Dave Burns, Marty Snider and Dillon Welch handled the pit road duties on site, and Rutledge Wood handled the features from the Busch Fan Zone at the racetrack during the race.

Radio
PRN had the radio call for the race, which was also simulcast on Sirius XM NASCAR Radio. Doug Rice and Mark Garrow called the race from the booth when the field races down the frontstretch. Rob Albright called the race when the field races down the backstretch. Brad Gillie, Brett McMillan and Wendy Venturini handled the duties on pit lane.

Standings after the race

Drivers' Championship standings

Manufacturers' Championship standings

Note: Only the first 16 positions are included for the driver standings.

References

Bass Pro Shops NRA Night Race
Bass Pro Shops NRA Night Race
Bass Pro Shops NRA Night Race
NASCAR races at Bristol Motor Speedway